The five teams in this group played against each other on a home-and-away basis. The group winner Croatia qualified for the 17th FIFA World Cup held in South Korea and Japan. The runner-up Belgium advanced to the UEFA Play-off and played against the Czech Republic.  The group had seen a very close three-way battle between Croatia, Scotland and Belgium, with several draws between the top three sides: ultimately it was only decided towards the end when Belgium's defeat of Scotland put paid to all but the mathematical goal-difference chances of the Scots, and left Belgium in first place in the group, only to be defeated by Croatia in the final match, with Croatia thus overtaking them for first place in the group and finishing unbeaten.

Standings

Matches

Goalscorers

6 goals

 Marc Wilmots

5 goals

 Boško Balaban

4 goals

 Bob Peeters

3 goals

 Bart Goor
 Billy Dodds

2 goals

 Émile Mpenza
 Yves Vanderhaeghe
 Gert Verheyen
 Alen Bokšić
 Robert Prosinečki
 Davor Vugrinec
 Marians Pahars
 Andy Selva
 Colin Hendry

1 goal

 Walter Baseggio
 Jurgen Cavens
 Wesley Sonck
 Daniel Van Buyten
 Nico Van Kerckhoven
 Niko Kovač
 Zvonimir Soldo
 Davor Šuker
 Goran Vlaović
 Aleksandrs Jeļisejevs
 Andrejs Rubins
 Andrejs Štolcers
 Nicola Albani
 Colin Cameron
 Matt Elliott
 Dougie Freedman
 Kevin Gallacher
 Don Hutchison
 Neil McCann
 David Weir

1 own goal

 Mihails Zemļinskis (playing against Belgium)

References

External links
FIFA official page
RSSSF - 2002 World Cup Qualification
Allworldcup

6
2000–01 in Scottish football
2001–02 in Scottish football
2000 in Latvian football
2001 in Latvian football
2000–01 in Croatian football
qual
2000–01 in Belgian football
qual
2001–02 in San Marino football
2000–01 in San Marino football